Celeste Deirdre Ferraris (born 29 September 1970 in Canberra) is a former synchronized swimmer from Australia.  She competed in the women's solo and women's duet competitions at the 1992 Summer Olympics.

References

1970 births
Australian synchronised swimmers
Living people
Olympic synchronised swimmers of Australia
Synchronized swimmers at the 1992 Summer Olympics
Commonwealth Games medallists in synchronised swimming
Commonwealth Games bronze medallists for Australia
Synchronised swimmers at the 1994 Commonwealth Games
Medallists at the 1994 Commonwealth Games